Campostichomma manicatum is a species of spider in the family Udubidae, found in Sri Lanka.

References

Udubidae
Endemic fauna of Sri Lanka
Arthropods of Sri Lanka
Spiders described in 1892
Taxa named by Ferdinand Karsch